One Night Only is a DVD of Ricky Martin's live performance that was released in the United States in December 1999. This presentation was filmed live at Liberty State Park. It was certified Platinum by the RIAA on May 31, 2000.

Track listing

Charts and certifications

Charts

Certifications

Release history

References

Ricky Martin video albums
1999 video albums
Live video albums